The 2014 Arkansas State Red Wolves football team represented Arkansas State University in the 2014 NCAA Division I FBS football season. For the fourth consecutive season, the Red Wolves were led by a first-year head coach. Blake Anderson, who was previously offensive coordinator at North Carolina, took over after Bryan Harsin left the program to become the head coach at Boise State. The Red Wolves played their home games at Centennial Bank Stadium in Jonesboro, Arkansas. They were members of the Sun Belt Conference. They finished the season 7–6, 5–3 in Sun Belt play to finish in a three-way tie for fourth place. They were invited to the GoDaddy Bowl where they lost to Toledo.

Schedule

Schedule Source:

Personnel

Roster
As of January 2014

Game summaries

Montana State

@ Tennessee

@ Miami

Utah State

Louisiana–Monroe

@ Georgia State

@ Louisiana–Lafayette

@ Idaho

South Alabama

Appalachian State

@ Texas State

New Mexico State

Toledo–GoDaddy Bowl

References

Arkansas State
Arkansas State Red Wolves football seasons
Arkansas State Red Wolves football